Jeanne Robert (11 August 1914 – 7 September 2017) was a member of the French Resistance.

Robert began her opposition to the Nazis by helping allied troops to make their way to the Dunkirk evacuation; this included helping them to obtain false identity documents. With France occupied, she fed intelligence to the British Special Operations Executive (SOE). She and her partner Maurice Rouneau moved to Vichy France, where they founded the resistance network "Victoire" in April 1942; this network became the largest in South West France. A teacher, she maintained her career as a cover and once had to escape from the Gestapo who had been waiting for her at the school gates. In October 1943, with the threat of capture being too great, she escaped France to England via Gibraltar. Having reached the safety of London in December 1943, she joined the Bureau Central de Renseignements et d'Action (BCRA), the Free French intelligence service. She returned to France following the liberation of Paris in August 1944. In recognition of her war service, she was awarded the Croix de Guerre. Considered overlooked by the post-war government, she was made a Chevalier of the Légion d'honneur in 2016. She died in 2017, having reached the aged of 103.

References

1914 births
2017 deaths
French Resistance members
Chevaliers of the Légion d'honneur
Members of the Bureau Central de Renseignements et d'Action
French centenarians
Female resistance members of World War II
French women in World War II
Women centenarians
20th-century French women